Ceci Velasquez is a Democratic member of the Arizona House of Representatives, serving since 2014. In addition to serving in the legislature, Velasquez also works as a paralegal. When first elected it was discovered that there was an outstanding warrant for her arrest for traffic fees.

Indictment
Velasquez was indicted by an Arizona grand jury on May 23, 2016 with three felony counts: fraudulent schemes and practices; unlawful use of food stamps; and theft. Velasquez pleaded guilty to one count of unlawful use of food stamps, a Class 1 misdemeanor. She paid restitution for the amount and was sentenced to 12 months of supervised probation and 100 hours of community service.

References

External links
Legislative Page
Biography at Ballotpedia

Living people
Democratic Party members of the Arizona House of Representatives
21st-century American politicians
Hispanic and Latino American state legislators in Arizona
Hispanic and Latino American women in politics
People from Litchfield Park, Arizona
Year of birth missing (living people)
21st-century American women politicians
Women state legislators in Arizona